Exothrix refers to Dermatophyte infections of the hair that infect the hair surface. This is in contrast to Endothrix, where a Dermatophyte mainly invades the hair shaft.  Using an ultraviolet Wood's lamp, endothrix infections will not fluoresce whereas exothrix infections will.

References
 

Animal fungal diseases